Geoffrey Alan "Geoff" Greenidge (born 26 May 1948, Fontabelle, St Michael, Barbados) is a former West Indian cricketer who played in five Tests from 1972 to 1973. His international career ended abruptly when he took part in a tour of Rhodesia, which was then under white minority rule. On his first-class debut in 1966–67, he scored 205 runs and took seven wickets in the first innings of the match.

Greenidge was the last white player to play for West Indies, until Joshua Da Silva made his debut in 2020. For a time, it was believed that Brendan Nash had taken this distinction in 2008, but Nash was later revealed to be of mixed race.

References

External links
 
 

West Indies Test cricketers
Barbados cricketers
Sussex cricketers
Barbadian cricketers
1948 births
Living people
D. H. Robins' XI cricketers